Eyes Wide Open (translit. Einayim Pkuhot) is a 2009 Israeli film. This script was written by the Israeli script-writer Merav Doster. It is the first film of the Israeli film director Haim Tabakman. The film was released in the UK on May 14, 2009 by Peccadillo Pictures The film was co-produced in Israel, France and Germany.

Plot 
Aaron (Zohar Strauss), a married Orthodox Jewish father of four living in Jerusalem, takes over his family's butcher shop after the recent death of his father. Ezri (Ran Danker), a nineteen-year-old homeless Yeshiva student from Safed who has just arrived in Jerusalem, visits the shop to use the telephone. After turning down Ezri's offer to help around the shop, he later finds Ezri asleep in the local synagogue and offers him space to stay at the shop. Aaron takes Ezri on as an apprentice and encourages his religious studies. Aaron offers Ezri a spare/store room upstairs in the shop. Later that day, while coming upstairs to see Ezri, Aaron finds a folder with some drawings made by his apprentice and seems surprised. He then expresses his admiration for Ezri's talent for drawing.

The two men become close after Ezri invites Aaron to take a ritual bath in the outskirts of the city. Rivka, Aaron's devoted wife, initially welcomes her husband's apprentice into their family circle. One evening after Aaron asks Ezri to draw his portrait, Ezri makes a sexual advance, which Aaron rebuffs. Later, however, they kiss and begin a sexual relationship. Rivka becomes suspicious when her husband begins to arrive late at home. Aaron is no longer interested in making love with his wife. Rabbi Vaisben, a family friend, warns Aaron against associating too closely with Ezri, reporting that he was expelled from his local Safed yeshiva (rabbinic school), but Aaron defends him. Being a devout religious man, living in Mea Shearim, a Haredi community, Aaron is torn between his family and devotion to God, and the intense feelings he has for Ezri
.

Aaron is repeatedly told that Ezri is a bad influence and perhaps even cursed; local people start warning Ezri to stay away from them. Flyers begin to circulate in the neighborhood, denouncing Ezri's deeds in Safed (later on the film it becomes clear that Ezri's ex-boyfriend Ephraim is involved) prompting many to boycott the butcher's shop. Under increasing social, commercial and family pressure, Aaron tries to break off ties with Ezri but is unable to bring himself to do so. Confronted by Rabbi Vaisben, Aaron is unabashed, feeling alive only now. Ezri encounters his former lover outside the synagogue, in the attempt to confrontate him about the flyers, which escalates into Ezri being attacked by some locals. Aaron witnesses the attack but does not intervene. He consoles Ezri afterwards, but they both realize it is time for Ezri to leave the community. Aaron continues to be distressed by this, asking for Rivka's understanding and protection. He returns early one morning to the spot where he took a bath with Ezri. He submerges himself beneath the water for a prolonged period before the camera fades to black. Merav Doster, the screenplayer, has said that the final scene should not be understood as a drowning, as Aaron can emerge. But the director wished to leave the end uncertain.

Cast 

 Ran Danker as Ezri
 Zohar Strauss as Aaron Fleischman
Ravit Rozen a.k.a. Tinkerbell as Rivka Fleischman
 as Rabbi Vaisben
Avi Grayinik as Israel Fisher
Eva Zrihen-Attali as Sara
 as Ephraim

Awards 
Eyes Wide Open competed in the official selection of the 2009 Cannes Film Festival in the category "Un Certain Regard".

Best Movie at the International Ghent Film Festival 2009.

Critical reception 
The film received positive reviews from critics. Review aggregator Rotten Tomatoes reports that 86% out of 35 professional critics gave the film a positive review, with a rating average of 6.9/10. A. O. Scott from The New York Times wrote in a positive review that the film "moves slowly and patiently through the ordeal of a single soul, illuminating in the process a cosmos of intense and hidden feeling."

See also 
 The Secrets (film)
 Red Cow (film)
 Disobedience (2017 film)

References

External links
 
 Eyes Wide Open at Rotten Tomatoes
Bluefat review 

2009 films
2000s Hebrew-language films
2009 drama films
2009 LGBT-related films
Israeli LGBT-related films
Films about LGBT and Judaism
Films scored by Nathaniel Méchaly
2009 directorial debut films
Israeli drama films
Films about Orthodox and Hasidic Jews
Anti-Orthodox Judaism sentiment